Andy Akiho (born February 7, 1979, Columbia, South Carolina) is an American musician and composer of contemporary classical music. A virtuoso percussionist based in New York City, his primary performance instrument is steel pans. He took interest in becoming a percussionist when his older sister introduced him to a drum set at the age of 9. Akiho first tried his hand at the steel pan when he became an undergraduate at the University of South Carolina. He began taking several trips to Trinidad after college to learn and play music. From there, he started writing pieces of his own.

Education
Akiho is a graduate of the University of South Carolina with a B.M. in percussion performance, the Manhattan School of Music with a M.Mus. in contemporary performance, and the Yale School of Music with a second M.Mus. in composition. He is currently pursuing a Ph.D. in composition at Princeton University. While he was an undergraduate, he was also a member of the Carolina Crown Drum and Bugle Corps of Fort Mill, South Carolina and then of The Cadets Drum and Bugle Corps of Allentown, Pennsylvania.

Career

Akiho has tried to learn everything he could with what was available to him at the time as a percussionist while at the University of South Carolina. He has played in a percussion ensemble as a classical percussionist, concert band, and in orchestras. Akiho had also joined a local West African percussion ensemble, Brazilian drumming ensembles, and steel bands. He began to realize once he finished at South Carolina that he truly loved playing the pans the most and from there he traveled to Trinidad several times without knowing anyone or having any connections. He started by speaking to the locals telling them that he had really wanted to play the steel pan there. During his first visit, he had stayed in Trinidad for five weeks playing with a big band who called themselves the PCS Starlift Steel Orchestra which was led by Ray Holman. In the following year, he played with another steel orchestra called Phase II which was led by Len "Boogsie" Sharpe.

Akiho's interest and confidence in going in the direction of music composition was influenced by him doing the Bang on a Can Summer Festivals in 2007 and 2008. Akiho has studied compositions with Julia Wolfe, David Lang (composer), and Michael Gordon (composer) and was greatly influenced by his teachers Christopher Theofanidis, Ezra Laderman, and Martin Bresnick at Yale School of Music. Jacob Druckman’s “Come Round,” performed at the Manhattan School of Music played a huge role in influencing Akiho when he began composing.

Akiho is involved in a stage production collaboration with The Industry's director, Yuval Sharon, who re-imagines Bertolt Brecht’s play “Life of Galileo” by taking part in composing the original music for. He found it challenging to collaborate with someone because he was used to doing abstract work to then working in a disciplined environment collaborating with someone who knew what they wanted. The project gave him the feeling that he was writing music for a movie, which in turn inspired him to want to do more of those kinds of collaborative work.

Awards
Sources:

2008 Brian Israel Prize
2009 ASCAP Morton Gould Young Composers Award
2010 Horatio Parker Award
2011 Finale National Composition Competition Grand Prize
2011 Woods Chandler Memorial Prize
2011 Yale School of Music Alumni Award 
2012 Carlsbad Composer Competition Commission
2012 Chamber Music America (CMA) Grant
2014 Chamber Music America (CMA) Grant
2014 American Composers Orchestra Underwood Emerging Composers Commission
2014 Fromm Foundation Commission from Harvard University
2014–15 Luciano Berio Rome Prize
2015 Lili Boulanger Memorial Fund
2022 Grammy nomination for Best Chamber Music/Small Ensemble Performance for Seven Pillars 
2022 Grammy Award for Best Contemporary Classical Composition
2022 Pulitzer Prize for Music finalist for Seven Pillars 
 2023 Grammy Award for Best Contemporary Classical Composition

Compositions
Akiho's early works were largely Caribbean-themed, folk and jazz based works for steel bands and steel pan players like himself. With increased experience and education, he has evolved into a composer of contemporary concert music.

Sources:

Phatamachickenlick (1997) for snare drum duet
Hip-Hopracy (2001) for 9 percussionists
Macqueripe (2002) for tenor steel pan
Omnipresent (2003) for tenor steel pan
Daidai Iro (Orange) (2005) for steel pan, cello, bass, and drums with toy piano & glockenspiel optional; also for solo tenor steel pan
Aka (Red) (2006) for steel pan, cello and/or double bass, drums, and optional violin
Momo Iro (Pink) (2006) for steel pan, guitar, bass, and drums; also for solo tenor steel pan
Murasaki (Purple) (2006) for steel pan, harp, cello, bass, and drums; also for solo tenor steel pan
Hadairo (Beige) (2007) for string quartet, harp, steel pan, bass, and drums; also for solo tenor steel pan
Karakurenai (Crimson) (2007/2011) flexible instrumentation for one or more players
I falleN TwO (2008) for steel pan and string quartet
the rAy's end| (2008) for trumpet, violin, and steel pan
Vick(i/y) (2008) for prepared piano
Ki-Iro (2009) for woodwinds, strings, harp, piano & 3 percussion
to wALk Or ruN in wEst harlem (2008) for flute, bass clarinet, violin, cello, vibraphone, and drums; also (2016) for 8 member percussion ensemble
21 (2009) for cello (double loop pedal and kick drum) and steel pan (double tambourine) or marimba (double tambourine)
Alloy (2009) for steel pans band & metallic drum set
Amalgamation (2009) for saxophone quartet and digital playback
NO one To kNOW one (2010) for soprano, flute, clarinet (doubles bass clarinet), cello, piano, percussion, vibraphone and/or steel pan (vibes & pan play same score)
LIgNEouS 1 (2010) for marimba and string quartet
Erase (2011) for flute, clarinet (doubles bass clarinet), violin, cello, piano, percussion
Five Movements for Piano Trio (2011) for piano, violin, and cello
In/Exchange (2011) for steel pan and string quartet
LIgNEouS 3 (2011) for marimba and string quartet
Six Haikus (2011) for baritone voice, trumpet, trombone, and bass clarinet
Stop Speaking (2011) for snare drum and digital playback
-intuition ) (Expectation (2012) for trumpet and marimba
Oscillate (2012) for string orchestra, piano, and 3 percussion
Three Shades, Foreshadows (2012) for cello and digital playback
Bagatelle (2013) for solo piano
Transparency (2013) for solo piano
Two Bridges (2014) Three Movements for Harp Duo
Deciduous (2014) for violin and lead/tenor steel pan
LIgNEouS 2 (2014) for marimba and string quartet
String Quartet 1 "Mobile on a Stream Into the Now" (2012) for string quartet
Revolve (2013) for string quintet
Speaking Tree (2013) for brass quintet, string quintet, and percussion
Tarnished Mirrors (2013/2015) Concerto for ping pong, violin, percussion, & orchestra 
Ricochet (2015) Ping Pong Players (2), Solo Violin, Solo Percussion, Orchestra (2,2,2,2 | 2,2,2,1 | Timp, 2 Perc | Strings)
Pillar IV (2014) for percussion quartet
Two Bridges (2014) three movements for harp duo
Beneath Lighted Coffers (2015) Concerto for steel pan and orchestra
LIgNEouS 4 (2016) for marimba and string quartet
LIgNEouS 5 (2016) for marimba and string quartet 
Prospects of a Misplaced Year (2017) for piano and string quartet
Lost on Chiaroscuro Street (2017) for clarinet, violin, cello, and piano
Cobalt Canvas (2018) for Flute, 2 Clarinets, Bassoon, Trumpet, Horn, Trombone, 1 Percussion Piano (2 players|4 hands), 3 Violins, 2 Violas, 2 Cellos, & Double Bass

Discography
NO one To kNOW one (Innova Recordings #801), 2011 – Performer and composer

The War Below, 2018 – Composer

Seven Pillars, 2021 – Composer

Featured on
Vicky Chow – AORTA (New Amsterdam Records) – Composer "Vick(i/y)"

Mariel Roberts – Nonextraneous Sounds (Innova Recordings #247) – Composer "Three Shades, Foreshadows"

RighteousGIRLS – Gathering Blue (Panoramic Recordings PAN03) – Composer "KARakurENAI"

Loadbang – Monodramas (Analog Arts AA1402) – Composer "Six Haikus"

Anthony de Mare – Liaisons: Re-Imagining Sondheim from the Piano (ECM Records 2470-72) – Arranger "Into the Woods"

Hong Kong Philharmonic Orchestra & Bright Sheng – Intimacy of Creativity – Five Year Retrospective (Naxos Records 8.573614-15) – Composer and performer "21 (Acoustic Version)"

Phillip O'Banion – Digital Divide (bcm&d Records 888295404686) – Composer "Stop Speaking"

Cover versions
An alumnus of two top Drum Corps International performing ensembles, Akiho is becoming a popular composer within the activity. In the summer of 2014, the Bluecoats performed to wALK Or ruN in wEst harlem. In 2016, it was performed by The Battalion while Golden Empire, Legends, and Oregon Crusaders played NO one To kNOW one. In 2017, the first corps he marched with, Carolina Crown, had NO one To kNOW one as a featured piece.

References

External links
 Andy Akiho's website

21st-century classical composers
American male classical composers
American classical composers
American electronic musicians
University of South Carolina alumni
Yale School of Music alumni
Manhattan School of Music alumni
Musicians from Columbia, South Carolina
1979 births
Living people
21st-century American composers
21st-century American male musicians
American percussionists
American people of Japanese descent
American musicians of Japanese descent
Steelpan musicians